The São Paulo Jazz Festival is a cultural and music festival held annually in November in São Paulo, Brazil. T

The 2016 edition  featured Daniel D'Alcantara, Hammond Grooves, Louise Wooley, Edu Ribeiro, Deep Funk Session, Dani Gurgel, Jazz100Strezz and a Tribute to John Coltrane.

External Links 
Official website: www.spjazzfestival.com/

References

Jazz festivals in Brazil